John Amabile (born 23 April 1962) is a Puerto Rican bobsledder. He competed at the 1992, 1994 and the 1998 Winter Olympics. In January 2002, he was sent to jail for seven years, after being found guilty of health insurance fraud.

References

External links
 

1962 births
Living people
Puerto Rican male bobsledders
Olympic bobsledders of Puerto Rico
Bobsledders at the 1992 Winter Olympics
Bobsledders at the 1994 Winter Olympics
Bobsledders at the 1998 Winter Olympics
Sportspeople from Jersey City, New Jersey
20th-century Puerto Rican people